The CARICOM Regional Organisation for Standards and Quality (CROSQ) is a regional standards body for the Caribbean Community CARICOM bloc of countries.

Partnering national bureaus 
 – Antigua and Barbuda Bureau of Standards 
 – Barbados National Standards Institution 
 – Ministry of Lands and Local Government
 – Belize Bureau of Standards 
 – Dominica Bureau of Standards 
 – Guyana National Bureau of Standards 
 – Grenada Bureau of Standards 
 – Bureau of Standards Jamaica 
 – Ministry of Economic Development and Trade Department-Development Unit
 – St. Lucia Bureau of Standards 
 – St. Kitts and Nevis Bureau of Standards
 – St. Vincent and the Grenadines Bureau of Standards
 – Surinaams Standaarden Bureau 
 – Trinidad and Tobago Bureau of Standards

See also
 World Standards Day

External links 

 CARICOM Regional Organisation for Standards and Quality (official website)

Caribbean Community
Non-profit organisations based in Barbados
Standards organizations